Under Mexicali Stars is a 1950 American Western film directed by George Blair, written by Robert Creighton Williams and starring Rex Allen, Dorothy Patrick, Roy Barcroft, Buddy Ebsen, Percy Helton and Walter Coy. It was released on November 20, 1950 by Republic Pictures.

Plot

Cast
Rex Allen as Rex Allen aka Mike Jordan
Dorothy Patrick as Madeline Wellington
Roy Barcroft as Henchman Hays Lawson
Buddy Ebsen as Homer Oglethorpe
Percy Helton as Nap Wellington
Walter Coy as Giles Starkey
Steve Darrell as Sheriff Tom Meadows
Alberto Morin as Inspector Arturo Gómez
Ray Walker as Robert B. Handley
Frank Ferguson as Counterfeitor Goldie
Stanley Andrews as Race Announcer
Robert Bice as Deputy Bob

References

External links
 

1950 films
American Western (genre) films
1950 Western (genre) films
Republic Pictures films
Films directed by George Blair
American black-and-white films
1950s English-language films
1950s American films